Castle Tower Apartments is a historic apartment building at 2212-2226 Sherman Avenue in Evanston, Illinois. The three-story building was built in 1928. The building has a "U" shape, a common form for apartment buildings in Evanston, with a large courtyard in the middle. Architects Cable & Spitz designed the building in the Tudor Revival style. Their design includes several rounded and square towers along the sides of the building, crenellation on the towers and roofline, sections of half-timbering, and patches of limestone on the otherwise brick exterior.

The building was added to the National Register of Historic Places on March 15, 1984.

References

Buildings and structures on the National Register of Historic Places in Cook County, Illinois
Residential buildings on the National Register of Historic Places in Illinois
Buildings and structures in Evanston, Illinois
Residential buildings completed in 1928
Tudor Revival architecture in Illinois
Apartment buildings in Illinois